Jonagold  is a cultivar of apple that is a cross between the crisp Golden Delicious and the blush-crimson Jonathan; the name Jonagold is a portmanteau of these two variety names. It was developed in 1943 in New York State Agricultural Experiment Station of Cornell University's College of Agriculture and Life Sciences, selected as N.Y. 43013-1 in 1953, officially released in 1968 by Roger Way.

They form a large sweet fruit with a thin skin that is green-yellow with streaks of crimson. The flesh is creamy yellow with a breaking texture and outstanding flavor. Because of their large size they are now favored by commercial growers in many parts of the world, and the apples can last two month in refrigerated storage and ten months in controlled atmosphere storage.

Jonagold is triploid, with sterile pollen, and as such, requires a second type of apple for pollen and is incapable of pollenizing other cultivars. It is susceptible to the diseases apple scab, powdery mildew, and fire blight, as well as the physiological disorders bitter pit and sunburn.

In 1988, the cultivar was awarded the American Society for Horticultural Science Outstanding Fruit Cultivar Award. , it was the most widely produced apple in Belgium, where it is used in Stella Cidre, and is credited with saving the Europeran fruit industry. , it was one of the fifteen most popular apple cultivars in the United States according to the US Apple Association.

The Jonagored Apple, a sport mutation of Jonagold discovered in Belgium in 1985, was once covered under United States Patent PP05937, now expired.

Descendant cultivars 

 Shinano Sweet (Fuji × Jonagold)
 Excel Jonagold
 Jonagored

References

External links

Apple cultivars with patented mutants
American apples